Carlos Ameglio (born 23 June 1965 in Montevideo) is a Uruguayan film director.

His film La cáscara was distinguished as the best film at the AFIA Film Festival in Aarhus.

Currently he is working on the Kiken project with Diego Dubcovsky.

Filmography
Los últimos vermicelli (1987, with Diego Arsuaga)
Psiconautas
La cáscara
El hombre de Walter
Porno para principiantes

References

External links

1965 births
Uruguayan film directors
Living people